William Ferris Brazziel Jr. (February 5, 1926 – November 21, 2010) was an African-American educational scholar. He was a professor of higher education in the Neag School of Education at the University of Connecticut for twenty-seven years until his retirement in 1996. Before joining the University of Connecticut, he served as director of general studies at Norfolk State University.

Brazziel, one of nine children born to William Farris Brazziel Sr. and Odis Isom Brazziel, earned a Ph.D. in Higher Education and Administration from Ohio State University.

References

1926 births
2010 deaths
20th-century African-American educators
20th-century American educators
21st-century African-American people
Norfolk State University faculty
Ohio State University College of Education and Human Ecology alumni
People from Tipton County, Tennessee
University of Connecticut faculty